Rupha Wayi (Quechua rupha burning, Ancash Quechua wayi house, "burning house", also spelled Rupahuay) is a mountain in the Andes of Peru which reaches a height of approximately . It is located in the Ancash Region, Bolognesi Province, Huallanca District.

References 

Mountains of Peru
Mountains of Ancash Region